The 1880 United States presidential election was the 24th quadrennial presidential election, held on Tuesday, November 2, 1880, in which Republican nominee James A. Garfield defeated Winfield Scott Hancock of the Democratic Party. The voter turnout rate was one of the highest in the nation's history. Garfield would be assassinated 6 months after his inauguration.

Incumbent President Rutherford B. Hayes did not seek re-election. After the longest convention in the party's history, the factionalized Republicans chose Representative Garfield of Ohio as their standard-bearer. The Democratic Party chose General Winfield Scott Hancock of Pennsylvania as their nominee. The dominance of the two major parties began to fray as an upstart left-wing party, the Greenback Party, nominated another Civil War general for president, Iowa Congressman James B. Weaver. In a campaign fought mainly over issues of Civil War loyalties, tariffs, and Chinese immigration, Garfield narrowly won both the electoral and popular vote. He and Hancock each took just over 48 percent of the popular vote, while Weaver and two other minor candidates, Neal Dow and John W. Phelps, together made up the remainder. The election of 1880 was the sixth and final consecutive presidential election won by the Republicans, the second longest winning streak in American history after the Democratic-Republican Party during the period 1800–1824. 

In the end, the popular vote totals of the two main candidates were separated by 1,898 votes (0.11%), the smallest victory in the national popular vote ever recorded. In the electoral college, however, Garfield's victory was much larger; he won the decisive state of New York by 21,033 votes (1.91%). Hancock's sweep of the Southern states was not enough for victory, but it cemented his party's dominance of the region for generations. This was the first presidential election in which people in every state were able to vote directly for presidential electors.

Background
The two major parties were the Republicans and the Democrats, and after the end of the Reconstruction Era in 1877, the national electorate was closely divided between them. Party membership was only partly based on ideology; party identification often reflected ethnic and religious background, as well as Civil War loyalties that were still keenly felt by many voters. Most Northern Protestants voted Republican, as did black Southerners. On the other hand, white Southerners and Northern Catholics generally voted Democratic.

Issues
The gold standard and the tariff tax on imports divided the major parties. The monetary debate was over the basis for the value of the United States dollar. Nothing but gold and silver coin had ever been legal tender in the United States until the Civil War, when the mounting costs of the war forced the United States Congress to issue "greenbacks" (dollar bills backed by government bonds). Greenbacks helped pay for the war, but resulted in severe inflation . After the war, bondholders and other creditors (based in the North) wanted to return to a gold standard. At the same time, debtors (especially in the South and West) benefited from the way inflation reduced the real value of their debts, and workers and some businessmen liked the way inflation made for easy credit. The issue cut across parties, producing dissension among Republicans and Democrats alike and spawning a third party, the Greenback Party, in 1876, when both major parties nominated "hard money" candidates (i.e., candidates who favored the gold-backed currency instead of "soft money" greenbacks that generated inflation). Monetary debate intensified as Congress effectively demonetized silver in 1873 and began redeeming greenbacks in gold by 1879, while limiting their circulation. As the 1880 election season began, the nation's money was backed by gold alone, but the issue was far from settled.

Tariff policy was a major source of party conflict in late 19th-century and early 20th century. During the Civil War, Congress raised protective tariffs to new heights. This was done partly to pay for the war, but partly because high tariffs were popular in the North. A high tariff meant that foreign goods were more expensive, which made it easier for American businesses to sell goods domestically. Republicans supported high tariffs as a way to protect American jobs and increase prosperity. Democrats condemned them as a source of higher prices for goods, whereas the higher revenues that they generated for the federal government were not needed after the conclusion of the Civil War. However Northern Democrats from manufacturing districts, especially in Pennsylvania, also supported high tariffs. In the interest of party unity, the leaders of each party often sought to avoid the question as much as possible.

1876 election
In the election of 1876, Republican Rutherford B. Hayes of Ohio defeated Democrat Samuel J. Tilden of New York in one of the most hotly contested presidential elections in the nation's history. The early results indicated a Democratic victory, but the electoral votes of several Southern states were disputed bitterly. Both parties in Congress agreed to convene a bipartisan Electoral Commission, which ultimately decided the race for Hayes.

For Democrats, the "stolen election" became a rallying cry, and the Democratic majority in the House of Representatives spent much of 1878 investigating it, although they failed to turn up any new evidence against their Republican foes. At first, Tilden was seen as the front-runner for the 1880 nomination. For leading Republicans, Hayes's inauguration in 1877 signaled the start of backroom maneuverings for the nomination in 1880. Even before his election, Hayes had pledged not to run for a second term, leaving the path to the White House open in 1880. His cabinet selections alienated many party leaders as well, deepening the growing divide within the Republican party between forces loyal to New York Senator Roscoe Conkling and those loyal to Maine Senator James G. Blaine.

Conventions
The parties agreed on their respective platforms and nominees at conventions, which met in the summer before the election.

Republicans 

The Republican convention met first, convening in Chicago, Illinois, on June 2. Of the men vying for the Republican nomination, the three strongest candidates leading up to the convention were former president Ulysses S. Grant, Senator James G. Blaine and Treasury Secretary John Sherman. Grant had been the leading military commander for the Northern forces during the Civil War, and had served two terms as president from 1869 to 1877. He was seeking an unprecedented third term in the office. He was backed by Conkling's faction of the Republican Party, now known as the Stalwarts. They were mainly known for their opposition to the civil service reforms sought by President Hayes. Blaine, a senator and former representative from Maine, was backed by the Half-Breed faction of the party, which did support civil service reform. Sherman, the brother of Civil War general William Tecumseh Sherman, was a former senator from Ohio serving in Hayes's cabinet. He was backed by a smaller delegation that supported neither of the major factions.

On the first ballot, Grant and Blaine gleaned 304 and 285 votes, respectively, while Sherman received 93. None of the candidates were close to victory, and the balloting continued in order to determine a winner. Many more ballots were taken, but no candidate prevailed. After the thirty-fifth ballot, Blaine and Sherman delegates switched their support to the new "dark horse" candidate, Representative James A. Garfield from Ohio. On the next ballot, Garfield won the nomination when he received 399 votes, most of them former Blaine and Sherman delegates. To placate the Grant faction, Garfield's Ohio supporters suggested Levi P. Morton for vice president. Morton declined, based on Conkling's advice. They next offered the nomination to Chester A. Arthur, another New York Stalwart. Conkling also advised him to decline, but he accepted. He was nominated, and the longest-ever Republican National Convention was adjourned on June 8, 1880.

Democrats

Later that month, the Democrats held their convention in Cincinnati, Ohio. Six men were officially candidates for nomination at the convention, and several others also received votes. Of these, the two leading candidates were Major General Winfield Scott Hancock from Pennsylvania and Senator Thomas F. Bayard from Delaware. Tilden was not officially a candidate, but he wielded a heavy influence over the convention. Tilden was ambiguous about his willingness to participate in another campaign, leading some delegates to defect to other candidates, while others stayed loyal to their old standard-bearer.

As the convention opened, some delegates favored Bayard, a conservative senator, while others supported Hancock, a career soldier and Civil War hero. Still others flocked to men they saw as surrogates for Tilden, including Henry B. Payne from Ohio, an attorney and former congressman, and Samuel J. Randall from Pennsylvania, the Speaker of the United States House of Representatives. The first round of balloting was inconclusive, with Hancock and Bayard leading the count. Before the second round, Tilden's withdrawal from the campaign became known for certain; delegates then shifted to Hancock, who was nominated. William Hayden English, a conservative politician and businessman from the swing state of Indiana, was nominated for vice president.

Minor parties

The Greenback Party convention gathered in Chicago in mid-June, using the hall recently vacated by the Republicans. The party was a newcomer to the political scene in 1880, having arisen as a response to the economic depression that followed the Panic of 1873, mostly in the nation's West and South. During the Civil War, Congress had authorized "greenbacks", a form of money redeemable in government bonds, rather than in gold, as was traditional. After the war, many Democrats and Republicans in the East sought to return to the gold standard, and the government began to withdraw greenbacks from circulation. The reduction of the money supply, combined with the economic depression, made life harder for debtors, farmers, and industrial laborers; the Greenback Party hoped to draw support from these groups. Beyond their support for a larger money supply, they also favored an eight-hour work day, safety regulations in factories, and an end to child labor.

Six men were candidates for the Greenback nomination. James B. Weaver, an Iowa congressman and Civil War general, was the clear favorite, but two other congressmen, Benjamin F. Butler from Massachusetts and Hendrick B. Wright from Pennsylvania, also commanded considerable followings. Weaver triumphed quickly, winning a majority of the 850 delegates' votes on the first ballot. Barzillai J. Chambers, a Texas businessman and Confederate veteran, was likewise nominated for vice president on the initial vote. More tumultuous was the fight over the platform, as delegates from disparate factions of the left-wing movement clashed over women's suffrage, Chinese immigration, and the extent to which the government should regulate working conditions.

A convention of the Prohibition Party also met that month in Cleveland, Ohio. The Prohibitionists, more of a movement than a party, focused their efforts on banning alcohol. Most party members came from pietist churches, and most were former Republicans. Only twelve states sent delegates to the convention, and the platform they agreed on was silent on most issues of the day, focusing instead on the evils of alcohol. For president, the Prohibitionists nominated Neal Dow, a Civil War general from Maine. As mayor of Portland, Dow helped to pass the "Maine law", which banned the sale of alcohol in the city; it became the model for temperance laws around the country. Finally, a revived Anti-Masonic Party nominated John W. Phelps, another Civil War general, on a platform of opposition to Freemasonry. Political prognosticators gave Weaver little chance of victory, and Dow and Phelps none at all.

Candidates

Garfield 

James Abram Garfield was raised in humble circumstances on an Ohio farm by his widowed mother. He worked at various jobs, including on a canal boat, in his youth. Beginning at age 17, he studied at Williams College in Williamstown, Massachusetts, from which he graduated in 1856. A year later, Garfield entered politics as a Republican. He married Lucretia Rudolph in 1858, and served as a member of the Ohio State Senate (1859–1861). Garfield opposed Confederate secession, served as a major general in the Union Army during the Civil War, and fought in the battles of Middle Creek, Shiloh, and Chickamauga. He was first elected to Congress in 1862 to represent Ohio's 19th District. Throughout Garfield's extended congressional service after the Civil War, he firmly supported the gold standard and gained a reputation as a skilled orator. Garfield initially agreed with Radical Republican views regarding Reconstruction, but later favored a moderate approach for civil rights enforcement for freedmen.

After his nomination, Garfield met with party leaders in an attempt to heal the schism between the Stalwarts and Half-Breeds. In his formal letter to the party accepting his nomination, written with advice from party leaders, he endorsed the ideas of high tariffs and sound money, but drew particular attention to the issues of Chinese immigration and civil service reform. On both, Garfield sought a moderate path. He called for some restrictions on the former, through treaty renegotiation with the Chinese government. He straddled the divide on civil service reform, saying that he agreed with the concept, while promising to make no appointments without consulting party leaders, a position 20th-century biographer Allan Peskin called "inconsistent". As was traditional at the time, Garfield conducted a "front porch campaign", returning to his home for the duration of the contest, and leaving the actual campaigning to surrogates.

Hancock 

Winfield Scott Hancock was born and raised in Pennsylvania. He attended the United States Military Academy at West Point and served in the Army for four decades, including service in the Mexican–American War and as a Union general in the Civil War. Known to his Army colleagues as "Hancock the Superb", he was noted in particular for his personal leadership at the Battle of Gettysburg in 1863, where he led the defense of Pickett's Charge, getting wounded in the process. His military service continued after the Civil War, as Hancock participated in the military Reconstruction of the South and the Army's presence at the Western frontier. During Reconstruction, he sided with then-President Andrew Johnson in working for a quick end to military occupation of the South and a return to government by the pre-war establishment. Hancock's reputation as a war hero at Gettysburg, combined with his status as a prominent Democrat with impeccable Unionist credentials and pro-states' rights views, made him a quadrennial presidential possibility.

Hancock was officially notified of his nomination in July, and responded with the traditional letter of acceptance. As Garfield had, the Democratic nominee sought to cause no controversy in his statement, which according to biographer David M. Jordan was "bland and general". After scorning the previous years of Republican rule, Hancock sought to tamp down fears that election of a Democrat would overturn the results of the war and Reconstruction, a common Republican campaign theme. Unlike Garfield, Hancock had no record in elected office, but the acceptance letter gave no further indication of his political preferences. Hancock remained on active duty during the campaign at his post on Governors Island in New York Harbor.

Weaver

James Baird Weaver was born in Ohio, and moved to Iowa as a boy when his family claimed a homestead on the frontier. He became politically active as a young man and was an advocate for farmers and laborers, joining and quitting several political parties in the furtherance of the progressive causes in which he believed. After serving in the Union Army in the Civil War, Weaver returned to Iowa and worked for the election of Republican candidates. After making several unsuccessful attempts at Republican nominations to various offices, and growing dissatisfied with the conservative wing of the party, in 1877 Weaver switched to the Greenback Party, advocating an increased money supply and stricter regulation of big business. As a Greenbacker with Democratic support, Weaver won election to the House of Representatives in 1878.

Unlike the major party candidates, Weaver planned to take the field himself, giving speeches around the country. His running mate, Chambers, was to do the same, until a fall from a train in July disabled him for the duration of the campaign. As the Greenbackers had the only ticket that included a Southerner, he hoped to make inroads in that region. Weaver's path to victory, already unlikely, was made more difficult by his refusal to run a fusion ticket in states where Democratic and Greenbacker strength might have combined to outvote the Republicans. His party's message of racial inclusion also presaged difficulty in the South, as the Greenbackers would face the same obstacles the Republicans did in the face of increasing black disenfranchisement.

Campaign

Bloody shirt
Hancock and the Democrats expected to carry the Solid South, while much of the North was considered safe territory for Garfield and the Republicans; most of the campaign would involve a handful of close states, including New York and Indiana. National elections were largely decided in close elections in New York and the Midwest. Practical differences between the major party candidates were few, and Republicans began the campaign with the familiar theme of "waving the bloody shirt", reminding Northern voters that the Democratic Party was responsible for secession and four years of civil war, and that if they held power they would reverse the gains of that war, dishonor Union veterans, and pay Confederate soldiers' pensions out of the federal treasury. With fifteen years having passed since the end of the war, and Union generals at the head of all of the major and minor party tickets, the appeal to wartime loyalties was of diminishing value in exciting the voters.

The Democrats, for their part, campaigned on the character of the candidates. They attacked Garfield for his connection with the Crédit Mobilier of America scandal of the early 1870s, in which many members of Congress were bribed by the Crédit Mobilier corporation, a railroad construction company. Garfield's precise involvement was unknown, but modern biographers agree that his account of his dealings with the construction syndicate were less than perfectly honest. Democrats used the incident as a contrast with Hancock who, as a career army officer, stood apart from Congress and lobbyists. Many in the Republican Party were reluctant to directly criticize the "hero of Gettysburg", but they did characterize Hancock as uninformed on the issues, and some of his former comrades-in-arms gave critical speeches regarding his character. Democrats never made clear what about their victory would improve the nation; Jordan later characterized their message as simply "our man is better than your man".

The Greenbackers saw the impact of Civil War loyalties more acutely as they vied for Southern votes. Weaver embarked on a speaking tour of the South in July and August. Although the local Greenback parties had seen some recent success, the national party, with an ex-Republican Union general at the head of the ticket, faced more opposition. The party's courtship of black voters, too, threatened the white Democratic establishment, leading to violent outbursts at Weaver's rallies and threats against his supporters. As Weaver campaigned in the North in September and October, Republicans accused him of purposely dividing the vote to help Democrats win a plurality in marginal states.  Weaver refused to cooperate with Democrats in running fusion slates of presidential electors. However, in state-level races, Greenback candidates did often combine with Democrats to defeat Republican candidates. In the September gubernatorial race in Maine, one such fusion ticket nominated Harris M. Plaisted, who narrowly defeated the incumbent Republican in what was thought to be a safe state for that party. The surprise defeat sent a shock through the Garfield campaign, and caused them to rethink their strategy of waving the bloody shirt.

Tariffs and immigration

After their defeat in Maine, the Republicans began to emphasize policy differences more. One significant difference between them and the Democrats was the plank in the Democratic platform endorsing "a tariff for revenue only". That is the tariff would only be used to cover the costs of the federal government, and not be raised higher to help specific industries. Garfield's campaigners used this statement to paint the Democrats as unsympathetic to the plight of industrial laborers, a group that benefited from a high protective tariff. The tariff issue cut Democratic support in industrialized Northern states, which were essential in establishing a Democratic majority. Hancock made the situation worse when, attempting to strike a moderate stance, he said "the tariff question is a local question". While not completely inaccurate—tariff preferences often reflected local concerns—the statement was at odds with the Democrats' platform and suggested that Hancock did not understand the issue.

The change in tactics appeared to be effective, as October state elections in Ohio and Indiana resulted in Republican victories there, discouraging Democrats about their chances the following month. Democratic party leaders had selected English as Hancock's running mate because of his popularity in Indiana. With their state-level defeat there, some talked of dropping English from the ticket, but he convinced them that the October losses owed more to local issues, and that the Democratic ticket could still carry Indiana, if not Ohio, in November.

In the last weeks before the election, the issue of Chinese immigration entered the race. Both major parties (as well as the Greenbackers) pledged in their platforms to limit immigration from China, which native-born workers in the Western states believed was depressing their wages. On October 20, however, a Democratic newspaper published a letter, purportedly from Garfield to a group of businessmen, pledging to keep immigration at the current levels so that industry could keep workers' wages low. Garfield denounced the letter as a ruse, but not before one hundred thousand copies of the newspaper were mailed to California and Oregon. Once the letter was exposed as a forgery, Garfield biographer Peskin believes it may even have gained votes for the Republican in the East, but it likely weakened him in the West.

Results
The extremely close election, with very high turnout, reflected the typical pattern of the Gilded Age. Democrats were assured of a Solid South electoral vote, as well as most of the border states. Republicans captured the Northeast and Midwest, winning the critical swing states of New York, Ohio and Indiana. The Republicans captured the electoral vote 214–155, but the popular vote margin was under 2000 out of over 9 million votes cast. Republicans won the House of Representatives 147–135, but the Senate was evenly split, with the vice president casting the deciding vote.

When all the ballots were counted, fewer than 2,000 votes separated Garfield and Hancock, the closest popular vote of any American presidential election before or since. The voters showed their interest in the election by turning out in record numbers; 78 percent of eligible voters cast a ballot, among largest percentages in American history. Each major party candidate earned just over 48 percent of the vote. Weaver won more than 3 percent, tripling the Greenback total of four years earlier. The other minor party candidates fared far worse, as Dow and Phelps earned 0.1 and 0.01 percent, respectively. Garfield carried the crucial state of New York by 20,000 votes out of 1.1 million cast there. Other states were much closer; Hancock's margin of victory in California was only about 144 votes.
In the electoral college, the vote was more decisive. As expected, Hancock carried the South and border states, but Garfield swept all but one of the Northern states (the exception was New Jersey, which he lost by just two thousand votes). Both candidates carried nineteen states, but Garfield's triumphs in the more populous North translated into a 214–155 electoral college victory. The sectional divide of the vote more deeply enforced the Republicans' retreat from the South after Reconstruction, and demonstrated that they could win without competing there. Weaver's resistance to fusion had no effect on the result; the combined Democratic and Greenback vote would have carried Indiana, but not any other of the states Garfield won, and the result would still have been a Republican majority in the electoral college. Hancock was convinced that the Republicans won New York by fraud. Lacking evidence, and mindful of the turmoil caused by the disputed election four years earlier, the Democrats did not pursue the matter.

Irregularities
In Virginia, a split in the Democratic Party over the payment of state debts led to two Democratic electoral slates being nominated, one by the regular debt-paying "Funder" Democrats, the other by the "Readjuster" or anti-debt paying faction of the party. Both slates were pledged to the Hancock ticket. Republicans initially hoped the split could lead Garfield to win the state, but the results were otherwise. The Readjuster ticket received 31,527 votes, but the Funder Democrats took 96,449 votes, enough to defeat the Republicans, whose slate had 84,020.

Although Hancock won Georgia's popular vote easily, there was an irregularity in that state's electoral votes. According to Article II, Section 1, clause 3 of the Constitution, "The Congress may determine the Time of choosing the Electors, and the Day on which they shall give their Votes; which Day shall be the same throughout the United States." In 1792, Congress had set the date for the Electoral College to vote on the first Wednesday in December, which in 1880 fell on December 1. However, Georgia's electors failed to cast their ballots on December 1, instead voting on the following Wednesday, December 8. Congress chose to count Georgia's vote in the official tally anyway; had they not done so, Hancock's electoral vote would have been 144, not 155.

Detailed results

Cartographic gallery

Results by state

Close states

Margin of victory less than 1% (15 electoral votes):
California, 0.06% (95 votes)
New Jersey, 0.82% (2,010 votes)

Margin of victory between 1% and 5% (131 electoral votes):
Indiana, 1.41% (6,642 votes)
Oregon, 1.64% (664 votes)
 New York, 1.91% (21,033 votes) (tipping point state)
Connecticut, 2.00% (2,656 votes)
North Carolina, 3.45% (8,334 votes)
Delaware, 3.87% (1,142 votes)
Pennsylvania, 4.26% (37,276 votes)
New Hampshire, 4.70% (4,058 votes)
Ohio, 4.72% (34,227 votes)
Nevada, 4.80% (881 votes)

Margin of victory between 5% and 10% (58 electoral votes):
Colorado, 5.23% (2,803 votes)
Maine, 6.14% (8,841 votes)
Illinois, 6.54% (40,716 votes)
Florida, 8.35% (4,310 votes)
Tennessee, 8.48% (21,514 votes)
Maryland, 8.78% (15,191 votes)
West Virginia, 9.89% (11,148 votes)

Aftermath

As Garfield entered office in March 1881, the Republican party schism that had been patched up for the election tore apart once more. Garfield appointed Blaine to the cabinet, and Conkling's Stalwart faction became irked at their lack of control over patronage, even in Conkling's home state of New York. Garfield appointed William H. Robertson, a civil service reform supporter, to the most lucrative government post in New York, and refused to withdraw the nomination despite Conkling's protests; in response, Conkling and his allies brought all legislative action in the closely divided Senate to a halt. In May, Conkling and fellow New York Senator Thomas C. Platt resigned from the Senate in protest. The two Stalwarts expected the New York legislature to reelect them in triumph; instead, the legislature deadlocked for months, eventually declining to return either man to the Senate. Before that result was known, however, Charles Guiteau, a mentally unstable man angry about not receiving a patronage appointment, shot Garfield in Washington, D.C. on July 2, 1881.

Garfield lingered for  months before dying on September 19, 1881. Vice President Chester A. Arthur, the New York Stalwart, was sworn in as president that night. Garfield's murder by a spoilsman inspired the nation to reform the civil service—and Arthur, erstwhile member of the Conkling machine, joined the cause. In 1883, a bipartisan majority in Congress passed the Pendleton Civil Service Reform Act to reform the worst of the office-seeking system, and Arthur signed the measure into law.

Congress also settled the issue of Chinese immigration, passing the Chinese Exclusion Act in 1882. Arthur initially vetoed a similar measure, which he believed contradicted the United States' treaty with China, but eventually signed a compromise bill, which banned immigration from China for ten years. Tariffs, a major issue in the campaign, remained largely unchanged in the four years that followed, although Congress did pass a minor revision that reduced them by an average of less than 2 percent. After a half-hearted attempt at the nomination in 1884, Arthur retired and died two years later.

See also
 American election campaigns in the 19th century
 History of the United States (1865–1918)
 Inauguration of James A. Garfield
 1880 United States House of Representatives elections
 1880–81 United States Senate elections
 Third Party System

Notes

References

Bibliography

Books
 
 
 
 
 
 
 
 
 
 
 
 
 
 
 Morgan,  H. Wayne. From Hayes to McKinley: National Party Politics, 1877–1896 (1969) pp 57–121. By H. Wayne Morgan. (Syracuse: Syracuse University Press, 1969. x + 618 pp. Illustrations ...
 
 
 
 Thomas, Harrison Cook, The return of the Democratic Party to power in 1884 (1919) online 
 
 

Articles
 
 Dinnerstein, Leonard. "Election of 1880." In Arthur Schlesinger Jr, ed. Running for President: The Candidates in their Images (1994) pp 345–83

Primary sources
 Chester, Edward W  A guide to political platforms (1977) online
 Porter, Kirk H. and Donald Bruce Johnson, eds. National party platforms, 1840-1964 (1965) online 1840-1956

External links

 
 1880 popular vote by counties
 Campaign Song: The Old Bloody Shirt
 Campaign Song: Glory of a Reunited Nation

 
Chester A. Arthur
Presidency of James A. Garfield
James A. Garfield
United States
Neal Dow